Fiona Finlay may refer to:

 Fiona Finlay, pseudonym used by Vivian Stuart (1914–1986), British writer 
 Fiona Finlay (producer) (born 1956), British film and television producer